The South American Youth Championship 1975 was held in Lima, Peru.

Teams
The following teams entered the tournament:

 
 
 
 
  (host)

Group stage

Final

External links
Results by RSSSF

South American Youth Championship
1975 in youth association football